Solitude Standing: Live at the Barbican is a live album by the American singer/songwriter Suzanne Vega. It was recorded on 16 October 2012 at the Barbican Centre in London, on the final celebratory concert to mark 25th anniversary of her studio album Solitude Standing. Disc one is a live performance of a full album, second one contains other Vega's songs.

Track listing 
Disc One
 "Tom’s Diner"
 "Luka"
 "Ironbound / Fancy Poultry"
 "In The Eye"
 "Night Vision"
 "Solitude Standing"
 "Calypso"
 "Language"
 "Gypsy"
 "Wooden Horse / Caspar Hauser’s Song"

Disc Two
 "Marlene On The Wall"
 "Left of Center"
 "Tombstone"
 "Blood Makes Noise"
 "The Queen and the Soldier"
 "Some Journey"
 "Tom’s Diner" (Reprise)
 "Caramel"
 "In Liverpool"
 "Rosemary"

Personnel
Suzanne Vega - acoustic guitar, vocals
Gerry Leonard - guitar
Mike Visceglia - bass
Doug Yowell - drums
Alison Balsom - trumpet
Hazel Fernandez - backing vocals

References 

2012 live albums
Suzanne Vega albums